The Coppieters Foundation, formerly Centre Maurits Coppieters (CMC), promotes policy research at the European and international level, focusing primarily on management of cultural and linguistic diversity in complex societies, multilevel governance, decentralization, state and constitutional reform, secession of states and self-determination, political and economic governance of sub-central governments, conflict resolution, human rights and peace promotion.

It is recognized by the European Parliament as a political foundation at European level, and it is affiliated with the European Free Alliance (EFA). Based in Brussels (Belgium), it develops its activities with the financial support of the European Parliament and its members. Coppieters Foundation also serves as a framework for national or regional think tanks, political foundations and academics promoting the study of national movements and minorities in Europe.

Structure
Coppieters currently has eleven full members and five associated members from eight different European countries. These members make up the General Assembly, and gather on a yearly basis to discuss Coppieters' main strategic working lines. The members are as follows:

Full members:
 Alkartasuna Fundazioa
 Arritti
 Ezkerraberri Fundazioa
 Fundación Galiza Sempre
 Fundació Josep Irla
 Fundació Emili Darder
 Home of Macedonian Culture
 Welsh Nationalism Foundation
 Le Peuple Breton
 Fundació Nexe
 ADEO

Associated members:
 CIEMEN
 Free State of Rijeka Association
 Istituto Camillo Bellieni
 Kurdish Institute of Brussels
 Hungarian National Council of Transylvania

Members of Coppieters Foundation elect a Bureau to run its activities by delegation: The Bureau gathers 4 times a year to manage the annual projects of the Centre, prepare the General Assembly and facilitate coordination of joint activities by Coppieters Foundation's members. The current Bureau was elected in the 11th General Assembly of the Centre Maurits Coppieters, held in Katowice (Silesia) from March 31 to April 1, 2017 and is composed by: (The 3 years term of the current bureau expires in 2020)
 PRESIDENT: Xabier Macías
 SECRETARY: Günther Dauwen
 TREASURER: Inaki Irazabalbeitia
 Alan Sandry
 Josep Vall
 Antonia Luciani
 Alix Horsch
 Marianna Bekiari
 Sharon Webb
 Antonello Nasone

The first outgoing members of the first Bureau became honorary members of the Centre:
 Fabianna Giovanninni (Bureau member until 2011)
 Pavle Filipov (Bureau member from until 2011)
 Syd Morgan (Bureau member from until 2011)
 Isabel Nonell (Bureau member until 2011)

Activities
One of Coppieters’ main activities is to publish reports and papers on issues related to culture, politics and European institutions with a focus on regional and minority movements. These reports are aimed at policy makers at a European level but also intended for the general public. They are usually authored by independent researchers.

A part from the reports, Coppieters also publishes shorter policy papers and organises conferences on topics such as language diversity, the concept of cultural footprint, and the internal enlargement of the European Union.

Etymology

Coppieters Foundation takes its name from Maurits Coppieters (1920–2005), a prominent Flemish politician who was a Member of the European Parliament for the Volksunie (VU) and played a pioneering role in the formation of the EFA. During his political career Coppieters advocated for the right to self-determination in the EU.

References

External links
 Coppieters Foundation
 Coppieters at the Transparency Register

2007 establishments in Belgium
Think tanks established in 2007
Think tanks based in Belgium
Political foundations at European level
Political and economic research foundations
Stateless nationalism in Europe
European Free Alliance